Oru Thira Pinneyum Thira is a 1982 Indian Malayalam-language film, directed by P. G. Vishwambharan and produced by M. Mani. The film stars Prem Nazir, Mammootty, Ratheesh and Premji. The film has musical score by Shyam and M. G. Radhakrishnan. The film was a remake of the Tamil film Oru Vidukadhai Oru Thodarkadhai.

Cast
Prem Nazir as Gopinath
Mammootty as Jayadevan
Ratheesh as Mohan
Premji as Kittunni Marar
Sathyakala as Sudha
Swapna as Rema
Kalaranjini as Latha
Jagathy Sreekumar as Rajappan

Soundtrack
The music was composed by Shyam and M. G. Radhakrishnan with lyrics by Chunakkara Ramankutty and Bichu Thirumala.

References

External links
 

1982 films
1980s Malayalam-language films
Malayalam remakes of Tamil films
Films directed by P. G. Viswambharan